LA-43 is a constituency of Azad Kashmir Legislative Assembly which is currently represented by Javed Butt of Pakistan Tehreek-e-Insaf. It covers the area of Rawalpindi City in Pakistan. Only refugees from Kashmir Valley settled in Pakistan are eligible to vote.

Election 2016 

elections were held in this constituency on 21 July 2016.

Election 2021 
Javed Butt of Pakistan Tehreek-e-Insaf won this seat by getting 782 votes.

References 

Azad Kashmir Legislative Assembly constituencies